Yuen Long is an MTR station in the north-eastern part of Yuen Long Town, New Territories, Hong Kong, on the  between  and .

History
Yuen Long and Long Ping station were built under a combined contract, numbered CC-202, which was awarded to the AMEC-Hong Kong Construction Joint Venture. The contract, worth HK$1.76 billion, commenced in September 1999. Piling was completed at Yuen Long station in November 2001, while the superstructure and civil works were completed by March 2002. A topping-out ceremony for both Yuen Long and Long Ping stations was held on 24 May 2002.

The station opened on 20 December 2003 with the inauguration of the West Rail.

A new station exit (Exit K), linking the station concourse to Yoho Mall, was opened on 31 May 2017.

On the night of 21 July 2019, an armed mob of alleged triad members dressed in white indiscriminately attacked civilians on streets with steel rods and rattan canes and attacked passengers in the station including the elderly, children, black-clad protesters, journalists and lawmakers. At least 45 people were injured in the incident, including a pregnant woman. The incident 
and the alleged mishandling of the police prompted a series of protests around Yuen Long, expanding the extent of Hong Kong's anti-extradition bill protests.

Hence, Yuen Long was included in the project and is now an intermediate station on the Tuen Ma line.

Station layout

It is an elevated through station with one island platform.

Entrances/exits
 A: Long Yat Road
 B: Nam Pin Wai
 E: Light Rail 
 F: Yoho Mall II 
 G1: Light Rail 
 G2: Tung Tau Tsuen 
 H: Pok Oi Hospital
 J: Ying Lung Wai
 K: Yoho Mall I 
Exits C and D are reserved.

Gallery

References

External links 
 

Tuen Ma line
Former Kowloon–Canton Railway stations
MTR stations in the New Territories
Railway stations in Hong Kong opened in 2003
West Rail line
Yuen Long District